Markus Grompe is a professor of Pediatrics and practicing physician at Oregon Health & Science University. since 1991. Since 2004, he has been director of the Oregon Stem Cell Center at OHSU. Until 2018, he was also director of the Papé Family Pediatric Research Institute, Vice Chair for research in the OHSU department of Pediatrics, and holder of the Ray Hickey Endowed Chair at Doernbecher Children's Hospital. 

Grompe is a specialist in  hepatology and stem cell biology, and is known for the development of the "Fah mouse model", a transgenic mouse with an inactivating mutation (exon 5 deletion) in sequence encoding fumarylacetoacetate hydrolase (Fah). This mouse strain has been a useful model of Type I tyrosinemia, a human genetic disease caused by inactivating mutations in the Fah gene. The mice have been used to model diseases such as malaria and to optimize human gene therapy strategies 

Dr. Grompe has made major contributions to the study of Fanconi Anemia. His contributions to the study of this rare hematological deficiency has helped to reveal the contributions of the FANC protein complexes associated with the repair of double-stranded breaks in genomic DNA.. He was involved in the establishment of the Fanconi Anemia Research Materials repository which helps to facilitate Fanconi anemia research through the distribution of antibodies and cell lines free of charge to interested investigators.

In 2007 Grompe founded Yecuris Corporation, which distributes mice with "humanized" livers to pharmaceutical and biotech companies for pre-clinical research in infectious liver diseases, liver gene therapy, and drug metabolism.

In 2016, he cofounded Ambys Medicines, which develops treatments for advanced liver disease through enhancement or regeneration of hepatocyte activity.

References

Year of birth missing (living people)
Living people
Oregon Health & Science University faculty
American businesspeople
American pediatricians